Blickling is a village and civil parish in the Broadland district of Norfolk, England, about  north-west of Aylsham. Since the 17th century the village has been concentrated in two areas, around the church and also at the park gates of Blickling Hall. Most of the village is contained in the Blickling Estate, which has been owned by the National Trust since 1940.

The villages name means 'Blicla's people'.

Historic buildings

The parish has many farmhouses, cottages and buildings, several of them are Grade II listed. This gives the parish an immense variety and also provides an unusually complete picture of vernacular Norfolk architecture.

Listed properties
St Andrew's Church is located on a knoll close to the entrance of Blickling Hall. The flint and limestone 15th century Grade II* church was substantially remodelled in the 19th century. Surviving from the medieval building is the collection of brasses, several are to the Boleyn family and Anne Boleyn. Sir Nicholas Dagworth (b.1390 an early owner of the hall) is buried in the church and marked by a tombstone. Also of note is the memorial to the eighth Marquess of Lothian by George Frederick Watts, and a memorial to the widow of the eighth marquess by Arthur George Walker.

Adjacent to the hall is the Buckinghamshire Arms public house. The present building and barn were built in 1700, although an ale house was recorded in the early 17th century.

To the west of the B1354 road is Silvergate a hamlet of estate cottages, some of which are thatched and Grade II listed.

Flashpits Farmhouse is located on the south east corner of the park at Ingworth Road, the red brick building was absorbed into the estate in the 18th century. But its origin is probably from the 17th century. One of only two properties on the road, the other being the unlisted Keeper's Cottage.

Aylsham Old Hall dates back to 1689 with parts of the building Grade 1 and Grade II listed. The dwelling is constructed of red brick with red hipped pantile roofing and located close to the B1354 road on the fringes of Aylsham.

Notable residents
Several of the Boleyn family are known to have lived in the village.

War Memorial
Blickling's war memorial is carved into the oak pulpit in St. Andrew's Church. It holds the following names for the First World War:
 Captain Adrian H. Graves MC (1897-1918), 40th Battalion, Machine Gun Corps
 Sergeant John L. Goulder (d.1915), 1/5th Battalion, Royal Norfolk Regiment
 Able-Seaman Herbert Pert (1882-1915), HMS Swiftsure
 Lance-Corporal Alfred W. Digby (d.1918), 6th Battalion, Bedfordshire Regiment
 Private Jack Foulger (1893-1915), 1st Battalion, Black Watch
 Private Albert Eastoll (1887-1916), 1st Battalion, Cambridgeshire Regiment
 Private Fred Hancock, Durham Light Infantry
 Private Charles A. Buck (d.1917), 1st Battalion, Essex Regiment
 Private Jack Flood (d.1917), 1/4th Battalion, Royal Norfolk Regiment
 Private Charles C. Broom (d.1917), 1/5th Battalion, Royal Norfolk Regiment
 Private Cyril F. Pert (1897-1915), Norfolk Yeomanry
 Private Charles Pert, Norfolk Yeomanry
 Private Ernest E. Digby (d.1917), 6th Battalion, Welch Regiment
 Rifleman James Tortice (1884-1918), 13th Battalion, Rifle Brigade (The Prince Consort's Own)

And, the following for the Second World War:
 Sergeant Marcus Seatter (1915-1943), No. 115 Squadron RAF
 Seaman Thomas W. Parke (d.1941), HMS Voltaire

References

 http://kepn.nottingham.ac.uk/map/place/Norfolk/Blickling

External links
Blickling watermill history
The Buckinghamshire Arms
Norfolk churches- St Andrews, Blickling
Blickling conservation area

 
Villages in Norfolk
Civil parishes in Norfolk
Broadland